Aethalida whiteheadi is a moth of the family Erebidae. It was described by Walter Rothschild in 1910. It is found on Luzon and Palawan in the Philippines. The habitat consists of clearings in primary and secondary forests at altitudes ranging from 100 to 950 meters.

Adults have been recorded on wing in March, September and December.

Taxonomy
The species was formerly treated as a synonym of Aethalida dora.

References

Moths described in 1910
Spilosomina
Moths of Asia